Mahidol University International College (MUIC) is Thailand's first public international college. It is part of Mahidol University and is located on the university's Salaya Campus in Nakhon Pathom Province.

History

The International Students Degree Program (ISDP) was founded in March 1986. It is the first international bachelor's degree program at a public university in Thailand. Six months later, the program accepted its first class of 45 students. The classes were taken on the second floor of the MU Social Science and Humanities Building. There were two full-time and 20 part-time instructors, a four-member support staff. The program offered a total of seven majors in the Sciences and Travel Industry Management.

In 1992, two addition majors namely Business Administration and Food Science and Technology were introduced and the program officially had its own new building which accommodates 486 students. Having been approved by the Mahidol University Council in 1996, ISDP was officially designated Mahidol University International College (MUIC). A six-storey complex was built two years later to accommodate more than a thousand of students along with a new management which include an expansion of  academic offerings, additional internships, including the Salaya Pavilion Hotel and Training Center, a pre-college program and several offices. The college's academic, physical and social landscapes were developed over the years. There have been the promotion of student exchange program  and a further expansion of its physical facilities including an eight-storey extension.

Now, MUIC offers a diverse range of 18 undergraduate majors and 24 minors in the Arts, Languages, Sciences, and Administration. Mahidol University International College also offered two master's degree programs, for approximately 3,200 students. The new building, Aditayathorn Building is completed in 2016. After its completion, MUIC is able to accommodate over 4,000 students.

Academic Divisions
MUIC's graduate and undergraduate programs are administered by the academic divisions. Each division is responsible for their respective curriculum and faculty. Below are the list of divisions at MUIC.

 Business Administration (BA)
 Humanities and Language (HLD)
 Science
 Social Science (IRGA)
 Fine and Applied Arts (FAA)
 Tourism and Hospitality Management (THM)

MUIC offers a broad spectrum of undergraduate programs in the Arts, Sciences and Administration that are designed to develop a new generation of academics, international managers and industry professionals. It currently has 18 majors for undergraduate programmes (as in December 2021).
 BACHELOR OF ARTS (B.A.)
 International Relations and Global Affairs
 Intercultural Studies and Languages
BACHELOR OF ARTS AND SCIENCE (B.A.Sc.)
Creative Technology
BACHELOR OF COMMUNICATION ARTS (B.Com.Arts) 
Media and Communication
BACHELOR OF FINE ARTS (B.F.A)
Communication Design
 BACHELOR OF SCIENCE (B.Sc.)
 Applied Mathematics
 Biological Sciences
 Chemistry
 Computer Science
 Environmental Science
 Food Science and Technology
 Physics
 BACHELOR OF BUSINESS ADMINISTRATION (B.B.A.)
 Business Economics
 Finance
 International Business
 Marketing
BACHELOR OF MANAGEMENT (B.M.)
Travel and Service Business Entrepreneurship
 BACHELOR OF ENGINEERING (B.Eng.)
 Computer Engineering

The City Campus is located in Sathon District, Bangkok and offers 2 postgraduate programs:
 MASTER OF MANAGEMENT (M.M.)
 International Tourism and Hospitality Management
 MASTER OF BUSINESS ADMINISTRATION (M.B.A.)
 Business Modeling and Development

Admissions

Students have to pass entrance examinations and an interview in order to get into the college. There is an English examination that utilises TOEFL ITP exam questions for four sections - Grammar, Writing, Reading and Listening, with an "Essay Writing" examination in order to evaluate students' academic writing skills. As in 2021, MUIC has 2 tracks for students to apply to MUIC: "Regular Track" for students who do not have any test scores (English and/or Mathematics) or already have the scores, but it does not meet their criteria and "Fast Track" for those who have obtained at least 6.0 on both overall and writing for IELTS Academic, 69 overall and 22 for writing section of TOEFL iBT or Pearson PTE (Academic) with overall and writing scored 50. For Mathematics scores, prospective students can choose either SAT or ACT required only math scores (e.g. SAT Math at least 600 for BBA majors). Please visit MUIC admissions for more updated information.

Partner Universities 
MUIC is currently partnered with over 70 countries to allow admission for international students to study at the university. In the United States, for example, it is partnered with 20 universities, including The University of North Carolina at Chapel Hill, The College of New Jersey (TCNJ), University of Wisconsin–Madison, University of Hawaii at Manoa, Kansas State University, University of North Texas, University of Arizona, Marquette University, Washington State University (WSU Pullman), San Francisco State University and California State University, Long Beach. In the UK, MUIC has University of Sussex, University of Bristol, University of Birmingham, Aberystwyth University and many more as its partner universities. MUIC has other partner universities in Europe (Austria, Denmark, Finland, France, Germany, Hungary, Poland, Spain, Switzerland and The Netherlands), Asia (Brunei, Cambodia, China, Hong Kong, Indonesia, Japan, South Korea, Malaysia, The Philippines, Singapore and Taiwan), Canada, Mexico, Peru, Australia and New Zealand. For more information about partner universities, visit MUIC partner universities. Currently, MUIC accepts three types of inbound students; full-time, exchange, and visiting.

Scholarships

Scholarships for high school potential students

1. ASEAN Students Scholarship.

MUIC offers a scholarship for ASEAN nationals (except Thais) who want to pursue their bachelor's degree at MUIC.

Qualifications
 Must be Southeast Asian nationals
 High school graduates
 Cum. GPA 3.00 or above
 Cum. GPA 3.00 or above while studying at MUIC
 Number of scholarship
8 scholarships a year
Duration 4 years

Scholarship details

 Waiver of full tuition fees for 4 scholarship recipients
 Waiver of 50% of tuition fees for 4 scholarship recipients

 2. MUIC Scholarship (Thai nationals) 

This scholarship is awarded to potential students (Thai nationals) with limited finances resources who have completed Thai high school in Thailand and have achieved a cumulative 3.0 GPA or above for 5 terms in high school. 
The scholarship covers a tuition-fee waiver for 5 years, from PC to graduation. Four scholarships will be awarded every year for each of the four entrance examinations.

Criteria:
 Students who apply for any major
 They must pass MUIC's entrance examination
 Students must maintain a cumulative GPA of 2.50 or above in each trimester during the scholarship period
 Parent's combined income should not exceed 200,000 Baht/year
 Scholarship recipients are required to participate in MUIC activities

3. MUIC Scholarship for Science Majors
This scholarship is awarded to potential students who have completed Thai high school in Thailand, although they do not necessarily have to be Thai nationals, and have achieved a cumulative 3.5 GPA or above for 5 terms in high school. The scholarship covers a tuition-fee waiver for 5 years, from PC to graduation. Four scholarships will be awarded every year for each of the four entrance examinations.

Criteria:

Students must apply for a Science Major
 They must pass MUIC's entrance examination in both mathematics and science with a score of 75% or above
 Students must maintain a cumulative GPA of 3.00 or above in each trimester during the scholarship period
 Scholarship recipients cannot change their major, unless it is within the Science Program

Reputation
Mahidol University was one of the first universities in Thailand to offer liberal arts, international, English-based Bachelor programmes. The opportunity proved to be a success amongst Thai students looking for a leg up into studying further degrees abroad. Mahidol University, as a whole, has been ranked the best university in Thailand in various ranking methodologies. Although the international college is an autonomous element of the institution,  it does not have its own academic ranking. However, the international college has benefited from the great availability resources, facilities, activities and teaching faculty provided by the university The college is said to be "one of the most successful international undergraduate degree programs in Thailand." It claims to hold a strong focus on liberal arts and "the promotion of a learning culture that prepares its students to meet the challenges of living and working in the 21st century." In 2010, MUIC received the Best Practice Award for its study abroad programs from the Commission on Higher Education, Ministry of Education, Thailand.

Mahidol University International College possesses strong extracurricular activities. It has a competitive Students in Free Enterprise (SIFE) programme which has won awards nationally. It has also a notably strong debate society. As of 2012, the debate club hash won 6 out of 8 national debate titles at the annual championship - European Union-Thailand Intervarsity Debate Championships and regularly top the rankings of Thai universities at international debating competitions.

MUIC is one of only two higher education institutions (the other being with Chulalongkorn University's Sasin Graduate School) to have received the 'Thailand Trust Mark' from the Thai Ministry of Commerce, indicating the high quality educational services that the college provides.

References

Mahidol University
University departments in Thailand
Educational institutions established in 1986
1986 establishments in Thailand